James Sánchez may refer to:

James Sánchez (politician), Connecticut politician
James Sánchez (footballer), Colombian footballer